{{Infobox school
 | name                    = Hercules High School
 | ceeb                    = 51206
 | image                   = HerculesMiddleHighSchool.jpg
 | image size              = 325px
 | established             = 2001
 | type                    = Public
 | district                = West Contra Costa Unified School District
 | grades                  = 9-12
 | principal               = Ryan Timothy
Shaw
 | mascot                  = Titan
 | colors                  = Black, Columbia blue, and silver
 | enrollment              = 867 (2018–19)
 | ratio                   = 23.56
 | staff                   = 36.80 (FTE)
 | publication             = linktr.ee/herctitantribune
 | newspaper               = Titan Tribune
 | yearbook                = The Olympus | location                = 1900 Refugio Valley RoadHercules, CaliforniaUnited States
 | city                    = Hercules
 | zipcode                 = 94547
 | country                 = United States
 | coordinates             = 
 | website                 = www.wccusd.net/herculesmidhigh
}}

Hercules High School is a secondary school located at 1900 Refugio Valley Road in Hercules, California, United States. The campus consists of both a middle school and high school on the same premises, with the administrative complex and library separating the two sides. It was established in 2001 as a 6-12 school. In July 2014 the West Contra Costa Board of Trustees approved the split of the middle and high schools as two separate schools. It is a part of the West Contra Costa Unified School District.

Demographics
As of 2010, the Hercules High School student population was 45.2% Asian/Pacific Islander, 25.0% Black, 14.9% Hispanic, 9.9% White, and 0.3% American Indian. 25% were considered economically disadvantaged, participating in a free or reduced-price lunch program, and 9% were English language learners.

Publications
 Hercules High School's newspaper is the Titan Template. John Brown ran the publication since the school's opening in 2001 until his retirement in 2009. Since then, Natalie Wojinski has taken over advising the newspaper. In 2009, it won an "excellent" in JEANC's Best of the West. 
 Hercules High School also has a fledgling online newspaper, ArkeNews. It is so named because Arke was the messenger of the Titans in mythology.
 Hercules Middle School's newspaper is the Titan Times and is advised by Lynne Dirk.
 Hercules High School's award-winning yearbook is The Olympus. It is advised by Natalie Wojinski.
 The school also has a creative literary magazine, The Dynamite Factory''. It is published by the Creative Writing class and is advised by Jamey Genna.
 The school paper later changed its name to the Titan Tribune, following a refresh after remaining inactive for several years. It was reinitiated in 2021. 
 The Titan Tribune is advised by Michelle Gerst and student, editor-in-chief Benjamin Kim.

Athletics
Hercules High School competes in the Tri-County Athletic League (TCAL) of the North Coast Section (NCS).

Basketball is the only sport available on the middle school side. However for the high school students there is badminton, football, cross country, tennis, golf, water polo, cheer, soccer, basketball, softball, baseball, volleyball, swimming, and track.

The Hercules High School Rhythm n' Motion Dancers dance production group ended in 2011 when the dance teacher Teresa Felix retired because the school's dance program was being threatened by budget cuts.

References

External links
 Hercules Middle/High School website
 Titan Template newspaper
 "Arke News" online news source

Hercules, California
Public high schools in California
High schools in Contra Costa County, California
Educational institutions established in 2001
Public middle schools in California
2001 establishments in California